McKean is a borough in Erie County, Pennsylvania. The population was 475 at the time of the 2020 census. It is part of the Erie–Meadville combined statistical area. McKean was known as "Middleboro" until it officially changed its name in 1970.

Geography
McKean is located in central Erie County at  (41.998941, -80.145475). It is surrounded by McKean Township. Pennsylvania Route 99 passes through the borough, leading north  to U.S. Route 19 in the outskirts of Erie and south  to Edinboro. I-79 leads north  to downtown Erie and south  to the Meadville area.

The borough is located along Elk Creek, which flows west to Lake Erie.

Demographics

As of the census of 2000, there were 389 people, 150 households, and 100 families residing in the borough. The population density was 673.6 people per square mile (259.0/km²). There were 161 housing units at an average density of 278.8 per square mile (107.2/km²). The racial makeup of the borough was 99.49% White, 0.26% African American, and 0.26% from two or more races. Hispanic or Latino of any race were 0.51% of the population.

There were 150 households, out of which 38.0% had children under the age of 18 living with them, 49.3% were married couples living together, 12.7% had a female householder with no husband present, and 33.3% were non-families. 26.7% of all households were made up of individuals, and 12.0% had someone living alone who was 65 years of age or older. The average household size was 2.57 and the average family size was 3.17.

In the borough the population was spread out, with 28.0% under the age of 18, 10.3% from 18 to 24, 25.7% from 25 to 44, 23.7% from 45 to 64, and 12.3% who were 65 years of age or older. The median age was 37 years. For every 100 females there were 95.5 males. For every 100 females age 18 and over, there were 90.5 males.

The median income for a household in the borough was $39,063, and the median income for a family was $46,250. Males had a median income of $31,875 versus $24,844 for females. The per capita income for the borough was $16,403. About 6.9% of families and 5.4% of the population were below the poverty line, including 8.8% of those under age 18 and none of those age 65 or over.

References

Populated places established in 1795
Boroughs in Erie County, Pennsylvania
1970 establishments in Pennsylvania